Amblyseius wangi is a species of mite in the family Phytoseiidae.

References

wangi
Articles created by Qbugbot
Animals described in 1992